Humphrey Bogart (1899–1957) was an American actor and producer whose 36-year career began with live stage productions in New York in 1920. He had been born into an affluent family in New York's Upper West Side, the first-born child and only son of illustrator Maud Humphrey and physician Belmont Deforest Bogart. The family eventually came to include his sisters Patricia and Catherine. His parents believed he would excel academically, possibly matriculate at Yale University and become a surgeon. They enrolled him in the private schools of Delancey, Trinity, and Phillips Academy, but Bogart was not inclined as a scholar and never completed his studies at Phillips, joining the United States Navy in 1918.

On the completion of his military service, Bogart began working in theatrical productions. He was initially employed as a manager behind the scenes for the plays Experience and The Ruined Lady, before trying his talents on stage in the 1922 play Drifting. A recurring legend about Bogart is that his dialog in the 1925 play Hell's Bells was "Tennis anyone?", but Bogart denied it, saying his line was, "It's forty-love outside. Anyone care to watch?" His body of stage work included more than a dozen plays, and lasted a little over a decade. He began to pursue a career in film by 1928, first appearing in the short film The Dancing Town, and then in the 1930 short film Broadway's Like That.  Bogart appeared in 75 feature films, and initially believed he was on the road to stardom when he secured a 1929 contract with Fox Film. The resulting productions of A Devil with Women,  Up the River, A Holy Terror, Body and Soul and Women of All Nations for Fox, as well as Bad Sister for Universal Pictures, were collectively a disappointment to him, and he returned to stage work in New York.

Bogart's break-out role was that of escaped murderer Duke Mantee whom he played in 197 performances of the 1935 Broadway theatre production of The Petrified Forest, with actor Leslie Howard in the lead. The play, and his subsequent casting in the movie version, propelled him to stardom, and secured him a movie contract with Warner Bros. He made 48 films for them, including The Maltese Falcon, To Have and Have Not, Key Largo, and Casablanca, the last of which earned Bogart his first nomination for an Academy Award for Best Actor. Bogart won the award on his second nomination, for his 1951 performance in the United Artists production The African Queen. His third Oscar nomination was for his performance in the 1954 Columbia Pictures production The Caine Mutiny. In addition to his film work, Bogart guest-starred in numerous radio and television programs, primarily reprising his film roles. He formed Santana Productions in 1948; the company's 1950 production of In a Lonely Place was chosen by the National Film Registry in 2007 for permanent preservation as "culturally, historically or aesthetically" significant. Santana Productions also created the 1951–1952 Bold Venture half-hour radio series as a vehicle for Bogart and his wife Lauren Bacall.

Broadway theatre (1920–1935)

After Bogart completed his World War I service with the United States Navy, he found theatrical employment in New York. He stage-managed the 1920 play Experience, and later became a road manager for The Ruined Lady. When he began to pursue an acting career, his debut role was in the 1922 play Drifting.

He appeared in 18 productions on Broadway, including the role that would propel him to fame and success in the movie industry; from January through June 1935, he appeared in 197 performances of The Petrified Forest as Duke Mantee, a murderer fleeing across the Arizona-Mexico border to evade capture by law enforcement. Leslie Howard appeared in the lead role as intellectual idealist Alan Squier. With the exception of The Petrified Forest, the sources do not indicate whether or not Bogart was in the entire run of any production.

Short films (1928–1930)

Bogart always believed that the future of his profession was ultimately in the burgeoning film industry. After signing with Charles Frohman Productions, he was cast as the male lead opposite stage actress Helen Hayes in a two-reel silent The Dancing Town (1928) for Paramount Pictures. He appeared in a Vitaphone short musical Broadway's Like That (1930), which also featured Joan Blondell and Ruth Etting.

Feature-length films (1930–1956)

 
He made 75 feature-length films during his career. Two serendipitous events helped pave a path for his career ambitions. During the last half of the 1920s, the film industry's transition from the silent era to sound shifted focus towards stage actors whose vocal talents had been honed in front of live audiences. When the 1929 stock market crash triggered the Great Depression in the United States, funding for stage shows became precarious. Bogart's brother-in-law, Stuart Rose, had become an employee of Fox Film, and was able to arrange a screen test for him with Fox executive Al Lewis. After viewing the test, the Hollywood home office of Fox sent Lewis a directive that Bogart was to be signed to a $750 per week contract, with an option of raising it to $1,000 per week if he performed as expected: 

The films made in Hollywood under his Fox contract were  Up the River (1930), A Devil with Women (1930), A Holy Terror (1931),  Body and Soul (1931), and Women of All Nations (1931; all Bogart's scenes were cut). While still in California, he also made Bad Sister (1931) for Universal Pictures.  Bogart was less than impressed with the end products, and returned to his stage career in New York.

When Warner Bros. purchased the film rights for The Petrified Forest, the studio retained Leslie Howard in the lead role he had performed on Broadway, but replaced Bogart with Edward G. Robinson in the role of Mantee. Howard intervened on Bogart's behalf to reclaim the role for him. Following the success of Bogart's performance in the 1936 film, Jack L. Warner put him under contract for $550 a week, with a morals clause, and financial options which could potentially more than triple Bogart's weekly salary.

He continued to appear in feature films for the rest of his life, and claimed that "at Warner Bros. in the 30s, I became a one-man film factory." He made 48 films for Warner Bros., more than any other studio he was affiliated with.  His body of work there included some of his most acclaimed films: Dark Victory (1939), High Sierra (1941), The Maltese Falcon (1941), Casablanca (1942), To Have and Have Not (1944), The Big Sleep (1946), The Treasure of the Sierra Madre (1948) and Key Largo (1948).  By comparison, he only made seven films with Fox, five films each with Columbia Pictures and his own Santana Productions, three films for Paramount Pictures, two for United Artists, and one each for United States Pictures, Universal Pictures, First National Pictures, Samuel Goldwyn Productions, MGM and Walter Wanger Productions.

Bogart created Santana Productions in 1948. The company produced Knock on Any Door (1949), Tokyo Joe (1949), And Baby Makes Three (1949) starring Robert Young and Barbara Hale, Sirocco (1951), The Family Secret (1951) starring John Derek and Lee J. Cobb, and Beat the Devil (1951), Bogart's spoof of The Maltese Falcon.  The company's production of In a Lonely Place (1950) was added to the National Film Registry in 2007, "to be preserved for all time". Inclusion of films in the registry are based on their "culturally, historically or aesthetically" significant quality.

List of feature films

Miscellaneous and uncredited film appearances (1944–1954)
Occasionally Bogart made public fund-raising or patriotic appearances on film. He also appeared in cameos, some uncredited, in a small handful of other films.

Radio and television (1939–1955) 
He made numerous radio and television appearances throughout his career. The Lux Radio Theatre was an anthology series featuring adaptations of Broadway plays and  film scripts. It aired on the National Broadcasting Company's Blue Network (the forerunner of the American Broadcasting Company) (1934–35); CBS Radio network (1935–54), and NBC Radio (1954–55).  The Screen Guild Theater (aka Gulf Screen Guild Theater aka Stars in the Air) was a radio anthology series broadcast from 1939 until 1952. Academy Award Theatre was a 1946 radio anthology series featuring adaptations of film scripts.  Kraft Music Hall was a radio musical variety show on NBC radio from 1933 to 1949. The Bold Venture half-hour radio series ran for 78 episodes during 1951–1952, and was developed by Bogart's Santana Productions, as a starring vehicle for Bogart and his wife Lauren Bacall.

Awards and honors
Bogart's first nomination for an Academy Award for Best Actor was for Casablanca (1942), a film that he and co-stars Ingrid Bergman and Paul Henreid initially believed was of little significance. Bogart won the award on his second nomination, for his 1951 performance in the United Artists production The African Queen. He was nominated a third time for The Caine Mutiny (1954).  He posthumously received a star on the Hollywood Walk of Fame in 1960. The United States Postal Service honored Bogart in 1997, at a ceremony at Grauman's Chinese Theatre unveiling Bogart's stamp as part of the postal service's "Legends of Hollywood" series. In 2006, the street in front of his boyhood home was renamed Humphrey Bogart Place.

See also
Lauren Bacall on screen and stage

Notes

References

Bibliography

External links
 

Male actor filmographies
American filmographies